Nelson was a cat who served as Chief Mouser to the Cabinet Office during the wartime coalition government under Winston Churchill.

A grey cat of undetermined lineage, Churchill first witnessed Nelson chase off a large dog from the Admiralty. Impressed by his bravery, Churchill adopted the cat, naming him after the British admiral Horatio Nelson.

Upon Churchill becoming Prime Minister in May 1940, Nelson moved into 10 Downing Street and became Chief Mouser to the Cabinet Office. Serving alongside the then-incumbent Munich Mouser. Nelson and Munich Mouser did not take a liking to one another, with Nelson often chasing Munich Mouser out of 10 Downing Street. The rivalry between the pair was later compared with that of Larry and Palmerston. 

In 1946, under the leadership of Clement Attlee, Nelson was succeeded by Peter II.

See also
 List of individual cats

References

Individual cats in England
Individual cats in politics
Working cats
Chief Mousers to the Cabinet Office